The 9×23mm Largo  (9mm Largo, 9mm Bergmann–Bayard, 9mm Bayard Long) centerfire pistol cartridge was developed in 1901 for the Bergmann Mars pistol.

Description and history 

The round was considered powerful for the day, producing a muzzle energy of between  depending on the loading. A number of small changes to the Mars and the cartridge were made and the pistol that resulted was called the "Bergmann–Bayard 1903".

This pistol was adopted by the Spanish army in 1905 as the "Pistola Bergmann de 9 mm. modelo 1903". Unable to find a German manufacturer to complete the Spanish order for 3,000 pistols, Theodor Bergmann turned to a Belgian manufacturer, Anciens Etablissements Pieper (who used the trademark "Bayard"), to complete the order. The final pistol, modified by AEP, was known as the "Bergmann Bayard 1908", or in Spain as the "Pistola Bergmann de 9 mm. modelo 1908". Although adopted in 1908 first deliveries did not take place until two years later. Meanwhile, other manufacturers such as Campo-Giro had adopted the 9mm Bergmann–Bayard round and, due to its long history of use in Spanish submachine guns, carbines and pistols, today it is most commonly known as the "9mm Largo".

At the same time the Bergmann–Bayard model 1910 semi-automatic pistol was adopted by the Danish military and remained in production until 1935.

The cartridge headspaces on the mouth of the case.  With  jacketed projectiles, the muzzle energy is 336 foot pounds, slightly lower than a standard-pressure 9×19mm Luger. Compared to the 9×19mm Luger +P, performance is also lower but at lower pressure in the 9×23mm Largo.   While external dimensions are almost identical, the 9×23mm Largo is a very different cartridge from the modern, high-performance 9×23mm Winchester.  Firing the thicker-walled 9×23mm Winchester round in a 9×23mm Largo pistol is dangerous, as old 9mm Largo pistols cannot handle the pressure generated by the 9×23mm Winchester. Performance is similar to the contemporary 9×23mm Steyr, but the cartridges were developed independently and their dimensions are just different enough to render them non-interchangeable.

Firearms chambered for 9mm Largo

Anciens Establissements Pieper (AEP)

 Bergmann Mars (1901)
 Pistola Bergmann–Bayard de 9mm modelo 1903
 Pistola Bergmann–Bayard de 9mm modelo 1908
 Bergmann–Bayard M1910
 Bergmann–Bayard M1910/21

Berthodl Geipel’s Erfurter Maschinenfabrik

 VMP(Vollmer) EMP/MPE Erma submachine gun, Spanish made copy called m41/44.
      
Astra-Unceta y Cia SA

 Esperanza y Unceta Campo-Giro Modelo 1912, 1913, 1913–16
 Esperanza y Unceta Astra 400 (Modelo 1921), 1921–1926
 Unceta y Compania Astra 400 (Modelo 1921), 1926–1945 or 1946
 Astra Model F (selective fire 'broomhandle' type pistol) 1934–1935
 Astra A-80
 Astra Custom SPS (IPSC racegun) 1996–?

Arrizabalaga

 Arrizabalaga  Sharp-Shooter
 Arrizabalaga  JO.LO.AR., 1924–?

CETME

 A.D.S.A. Model 1953 submachine gun 1953–?
 CETME C2 submachine gun

Comissió d'Industries de Guerra (CIG)

 Pistol Isard Isard Pistol

Destroyer carbine and similar 9mm Largo carbines

 Ayra Duria et al.
 Jose Luis Maquibar
 Onena Carbine
 Ignacio Zubillaga

Fábrica de Armas, A Coruña

 Modelo 1941/44 submachine gun (copy of the Vollmer Erma in 9mm Largo) 1941 – mid 1950s
 Copy of the Bergmann MP28 in 9mm Largo
 "No maker" Astra 400 (Modelo 1921), 1938–1940s

Fontbernat

 Labora Fontbernat M-1938 submachine gun

Llama

 Gabilondo Llama Modelo IV
 Gabilondo Llama Modelo V
 Gabilondo Llama Modelo VII
 Gabilondo Llama Modelo VIII
 Gabilondo Llama Modelo Extra

Parinco

 Model 3R submachine gun 1959–?

Republica Española

 "Naranjero" submachine gun (Modified Bergmann MP28)
 RE (Republica Española) made Astra 400 (Modelo 1921), 1936–1939
 Pistol F. Ascaso 1937–1939

Star Bonifacio Echeverria

 Bonifacio Echeverria Star Modelo Militar 1920, 1920–1921
 Bonifacio Echeverria Star Modelo Militar 1921, 1921 only
 Bonifacio Echeverria Star Modelo Militar 1922, 1922–1931
 Bonifacio Echeverria Star Modelo A (early w/flat backstrap), 1924–1931
 Bonifacio Echeverria Star Modelo A (late w/1911 Colt-style backstrap),1931–1983
 Bonifacio Echeverria Star Modelo M (slightly larger than A), 1931–1983
 Bonifacio Echeverria Star Modelo MD (M w/selective fire), 1931–1983
 Bonifacio Echeverria Star Modelo Super-A (A w/quick takedown), 1946–1983
 Bonifacio Echeverria Star Modelo Super-M (M w/quick takedown), 1946–1983
 Bonifacio Echeverria Star Modelo AS (A w/magazine safety, quick takedown, loaded chamber indicator), 1956–1983
 Bonifacio Echeverria Star Modelo MS (M w/quick takedown, loaded chamber indicator), 1956–1983
 Star Model Z-45 Submachine gun
 Model Z-62 submachine gun

See also
 9 mm caliber

Notes

External links

 Las pistolas Bergmann y Campo-Giro (I) by Juan L Calvo
 Las pistolas Bergmann y Campo-Giro (y II) by Juan L Calvo

9mm Largo firearms
Dual-purpose handgun/rifle cartridges
Military cartridges
Pistol and rifle cartridges
Weapons and ammunition introduced in 1910